Subhranshu Senapati (born 30 December 1996) is an Indian cricketer. He made his first-class debut for Odisha in the 2016–17 Ranji Trophy on 6 October 2016. He made his Twenty20 debut for Odisha in the 2016–17 Inter State Twenty-20 Tournament on 3 February 2017. He made his List A debut for Odisha in the 2016–17 Vijay Hazare Trophy on 25 February 2017.

He was the leading run-scorer for Odisha in the 2017–18 Ranji Trophy, with 427 runs in six matches. He was also the leading run-scorer for Odisha in the 2018–19 Ranji Trophy, with 617 runs in nine matches. In February 2022, he was bought by the Chennai Super Kings in the auction for the 2022 Indian Premier League tournament.

References

External links
 

1996 births
Living people
Indian cricketers
Odisha cricketers
People from Kendujhar district
Cricketers from Odisha
Wicket-keepers